Minster Gates is a north–south running street in the city centre of York, England, connecting Minster Yard and High Petergate. All of its buildings are listed, many dating to the 18th century, although the street is significantly older.

History
The street originated as the northernmost part of Stonegate, running through a gate providing access to the Minster Close, around York Minster.  In the late-13th century, St Peter's Prison stood on the street.

The road was pedestrianised by 1370, when posts blocked traffic through the gate.  By 1470, the street was known as Bookland Lane, at which time, it was the location of a public drinking fountain.  The street later became known as Bookbinders' Alley.  This referred to the printing industry which was based in the area, serving in particular the clergy of the Minster.  The trade boomed after 1662, when Charles II of England made York one of only four English cities permitted to publish books.

By the 1730s, the street was regarded as the main entrance to the Minster Close.  The gateway was demolished in about 1800.

Layout and architecture

The street runs north-east, from the junction of Stonegate, High Petergate and Low Petergate, to Minster Yard, opposite the south door of York Minster.

All the buildings on the street are listed.  On the north-west side of the street lie 1 Minster Gates (with 15th-century origins) and 3–9 Minster Gates, a terrace of three-storey houses built in the early 18th-century.  On the south-east side are 2–8 Minster Gates, a terrace built in the 1840s, and 10a and 10 Minster Yard, completed in 1763.

References

Streets in York